Morecambe and Heysham was a municipal borough in Lancashire, England. It was formed in 1928 by the merging of Morecambe Municipal Borough and Heysham Urban District, and abolished in 1974 when it was absorbed into the City of Lancaster local government district.

Footnotes 

History of Lancashire
Local government in Lancaster
Districts of England abolished by the Local Government Act 1972
Districts of England created by the Local Government Act 1894
Municipal boroughs of England
Morecambe